Albin Döbrich (7 January 1872 – 1945) was an Austrian sculptor. His work was part of the sculpture event in the art competition at the 1948 Summer Olympics.

References

1872 births
1945 deaths
20th-century Austrian sculptors
Austrian male sculptors
Olympic competitors in art competitions
People from Sonneberg
20th-century Austrian male artists